The Cascade Building (formerly known as the Bedell Building) is a historic high-rise located at 520–538 SW 6th Avenue in Downtown Portland, Oregon. It was built in 1925 and was listed on the National Register of Historic Places on February 23, 1989.

See also
 National Register of Historic Places listings in Southwest Portland, Oregon
Yule marble

References

Further reading

External links
 

1925 establishments in Oregon
A. E. Doyle buildings
Commercial buildings on the National Register of Historic Places in Oregon
Commercial Style architecture in the United States
National Register of Historic Places in Portland, Oregon
Office buildings completed in 1925
Portland Historic Landmarks
Southwest Portland, Oregon